Holger Behrendt (born 29 January 1964 in Schönebeck, Bezirk Magdeburg) is a German gymnast and Olympic champion.

Olympics
Holger Behrendt competed for East Germany at the 1988 Summer Olympics in Seoul where he received a gold medal in rings, a silver medal in team combined exercises, and a bronze medal in horizontal bar.

World championships
Behrend participated on the team that received bronze for East Germany at the 1985 World Artistic Gymnastics Championships in Montreal.

At the 1987 World Artistic Gymnastics Championships in Rotterdam he received a bronze medal in horizontal bar, and again a bronze medal with the team from East Germany.

References

1964 births
Living people
People from Schönebeck
People from Bezirk Magdeburg
German male artistic gymnasts
Sportspeople from Saxony-Anhalt
National People's Army military athletes
Olympic gymnasts of East Germany
Gymnasts at the 1988 Summer Olympics
Olympic gold medalists for East Germany
Olympic silver medalists for East Germany
Olympic bronze medalists for East Germany
Olympic medalists in gymnastics
Medalists at the 1988 Summer Olympics
Medalists at the World Artistic Gymnastics Championships
European champions in gymnastics
Recipients of the Patriotic Order of Merit in gold